Ekrem Bradarić (born 12 July 1969) is a Bosnian professional football manager and former player. He was most recently the assistant manager of First League of FBIH club Vis Simm-Bau.

Club career
Bradarić played as a defender for Sloboda Tuzla, Rijeka, Čelik Zenica, Adanaspor, Ljubuški, Gradina and Travnik.

International career
Bradarić made his debut for Bosnia and Herzegovina in an April 1996 friendly match against Albania in Zenica and has earned a total of 2 caps, scoring no goals. His second and final international was a November 1997 friendly against Tunisia.

Managerial career
As a manager, Bradarić worked at Bosnian clubs Vis Simm-Bau and Krivaja.

Honours

Player
Travnik
First League of FBIH: 2006–07

References

External links

Profile at TFF.org

1969 births
Living people
People from Maglaj
Association football defenders
Yugoslav footballers
Bosnia and Herzegovina footballers
Bosnia and Herzegovina international footballers
FK Sloboda Tuzla players
HNK Rijeka players
NK Čelik Zenica players
Adanaspor footballers
NK Ljubuški players
OFK Gradina players
NK Travnik players
NK Vitez players
Yugoslav First League players
Croatian Football League players
Süper Lig players
Premier League of Bosnia and Herzegovina players
First League of the Federation of Bosnia and Herzegovina players
Bosnia and Herzegovina expatriate footballers
Expatriate footballers in Croatia
Bosnia and Herzegovina expatriate sportspeople in Croatia
Expatriate footballers in Turkey
Bosnia and Herzegovina expatriate sportspeople in Turkey
Bosnia and Herzegovina football managers
NK Vis Simm-Bau managers